Ishi (c. 1860–1916) was an American Indian thought to be the last of the Yahi tribe.

Ishi may also refer to:
 Eshraque "iSHi" Mughal (born 1981), Swedish music producer and songwriter
 India State Hunger Index
 Ishi Press, Japanese publishing company focused on the game Go
 Ishi: The Last of His Tribe, TV-film on the Indian Ishi, 1978
 Ishi Wilderness, Yahi tribe lands, now a wilderness area located in the Lassen National Forest

See also
Ishii, Japanese surname